KupujemProdajem is the most popular Serbian classified ads website.
As of October 2022, this online platform has over 4.5 million active listings for sale, and more than 2.5 million registered users.

It is one of the most visited websites in Serbia.

The beginning 
KupujemProdajem was launched as the gadget news website, and shortly after shifted as the free classifieds with most of the ads in the category of music and musical instruments.

Sources

External links 
 10 years of the biggest advertising portal in Serbia, "Diplomacy&Commerce", 2017-10-4
 Develepors m'Day
 Bojan Leković, founder of KupujemProdajem "We can learn a lot from Duch people, but it goes both ways", Ekapija 2018-11-27

Online marketplaces of Serbia
Internet properties established in 2008
2008 establishments in Serbia